Zdzisław Birnbaum (28 February 1878 in Warsaw – 27 [?] September 1921 in Berlin) was a Polish violinist and conductor.

References
Entry in the Encyklopedia muzyki PWN (in Polish)

1878 births
1921 deaths
Polish classical violinists
Male classical violinists
Polish conductors (music)
Male conductors (music)
Polish Jews
Musicians from Warsaw